The 2014 SMU Mustangs football team represented Southern Methodist University in the 2014 NCAA Division I FBS football season. They were led by seventh-year head coach June Jones for two games and interim head coach Tom Mason for the remainder of the season. They played their home games at Gerald J. Ford Stadium in University Park, Texas, an enclave of Dallas and were members of the American Athletic Conference. They finished the season 1–11, 1–7 in AAC play to finish in last place.

After an 0–2 start to the season, head coach June Jones resigned on September 8, citing "personal issues". He finished with a record of 36–43 in just over six seasons. Defensive coordinator Tom Mason led the Mustangs for the remainder of the season. Mason was not retained at the end of the season.

Schedule

Source:

Roster

Game summaries

Baylor

North Texas

Texas A&M

TCU

East Carolina

Cincinnati

Memphis

Tulsa

South Florida

Central Florida

Houston

UConn

References

SMU
SMU Mustangs football seasons
SMU Mustangs football